Nasrabad (also Romanized as Naşrābād; also known as Naşīrābād) is a village in Dastgerdan Rural District, Dastgerdan District, Tabas County, South Khorasan Province, Iran. At the 2006 census, its population was 20, in 6 families.

References 

Populated places in Tabas County